The Crookdale Horseshoe is a group of hills on the eastern edge of the English Lake District, in Cumbria, west of the A6 road. They are the subject of a chapter of Wainwright's book The Outlying Fells of Lakeland. As he points out, the ridge forming the northern part of the "horseshoe" is described in his Wasdale Horseshoe chapter.

References

 

Fells of the Lake District